Anadarko is an unincorporated community in Rusk County, located in the U.S. state of Texas. According to the Handbook of Texas, the community had a population of 30 in 2000. It is located within the Longview, Texas metropolitan area.

History
The area in what is known as Anadarko today was first settled in the 1840s, in which one of them was Julien Sidney Devereux, who owned the Monte Verdi Plantation. A post office was established at Anadarko on November 12, 1849, and remained in operation until 1878, with William I. Barry as postmaster. It remained a farming community for the rest of the century. In the 1930s, Anadarko had several scattered houses and churches. Its population was 30 in 2000.

Geography
U.S. Route 84 exits into Anadarko on Farm to Market Road 2753.

Education
Anadarko had its own school in the 1930s. Today, the community is served by the Laneville Independent School District.

Notes

Unincorporated communities in Cherokee County, Texas
Unincorporated communities in Texas